Cheung Chun Hei (born 3 April 1991) is a Hong Kong footballer who plays for Hong Kong First Division League club Sun Pegasus, as a centre-back.

Club career

South China
In July 2011, Cheung Chun Hei was promoted from the reserve to the first team. He was given number 35 after he was promoted to the first team.

In August 2011, he was being loaned to a new formed club Hong Kong Sapling.

Hong Kong Sapling
Cheung Chun Hei made his debut for Hong Kong Sapling against Wofoo Tai Po on 11 September 2011. He was one of the two usual center backs for the beginning of the season. However, his performance was not well and he was usually a substitute in a match afterwards. He made a big improvement and thus got his starting XI place again in January 2012. He made a total of 12 league appearances and four cup games.

Sun Pegasus
Cheung joined Sun Pegasus for an undisclosed fee.

Career statistics

As of 17 June 2012

References

1991 births
Living people
Association football defenders
Hong Kong footballers
Hong Kong First Division League players
South China AA players
Dreams Sports Club players